"Name of the Game" is the sixth track from power pop band Badfinger's 1971 album, Straight Up. The song was written by Pete Ham.

Background

After the release of their album No Dice, Badfinger began work on an untitled follow-up. Geoff Emerick produced sessions for the songs that were to be on the album, among them being "Name of the Game". "Name of the Game" was also intended to be released as the lead single from this album, backed with "Suitcase", a track written by Joey Molland, but, despite efforts from George Harrison (who was impressed greatly by the track) to remix the song, the single, as well as the rest of the album, were canceled. This single edit appeared on some reissues of Straight Up.

When George Harrison returned to produce a new album for Badfinger, one of the songs that he worked on was "Name of the Game". However, upon his departure due to The Concert for Bangladesh, Todd Rundgren came to finish the album. Upon its completion, the album, now titled Straight Up, featured "Name of the Game" at the end of side one.

"Name of the Game" also appeared as the A-side of a single in the Philippines (backed with "Perfection".)

Reception

"Name of the Game" has generally received positive reviews from critics. AllMusic'''s Stephen Thomas Erlewine called "Name of the Game" a "note-perfect pop ballad," while Apple Records' overview of Straight Up'' said that "Name of the Game" was "epic both in sound and in sentiment."

"Name of the Game" was also a favorite of the members of Badfinger. Guitarist Joey Molland said that "We [members of Badfinger] were all knocked out by that.”

References

Badfinger songs
Rock ballads
Songs written by Pete Ham
Song recordings produced by Todd Rundgren
Song recordings produced by George Harrison
1971 songs